Thomas Ray Casey, better known as Tom "Citation" Casey (July 30, 1924 – October 10, 2002) played for the Winnipeg Blue Bombers of the Western Interprovincial Football Union from 1950 to 1956, during which time he led the league in rushing yards and was named a divisional all-star each year.  He was elected into the Canadian Football Hall of Fame in 1964, the first African American to be inducted.  He also played one year for the Hamilton Wildcats in 1949.  He was named to the All-Time Blue Bomber Greats 75th Anniversary team.

Casey was a practicing medical doctor.  Casey attended Hampton University.  While attending Hampton he was on the charter line in 1947 for the Gamma Epsilon chapter of the Omega Psi Phi fraternity. He was inducted into the Manitoba Sports Hall of Fame and Museum in 1993. Casey died on October 10, 2002.

Casey was the son-in-law of African American entrepreneur Samuel B. Fuller.

References

External links
Tom Casey’s biography at Manitoba Sports Hall of Fame and Museum

1924 births
2002 deaths
New York Yankees (AAFC) players
Winnipeg Blue Bombers players
Hamilton Wildcats football players
Hampton Pirates football players
Canadian Football Hall of Fame inductees
African-American players of American football
African-American players of Canadian football
People from Wellsville, Ohio
Players of American football from Ohio
Canadian football running backs
Manitoba Sports Hall of Fame inductees
Ontario Rugby Football Union players
20th-century African-American sportspeople
21st-century African-American people